Lepidochrysops stormsi is a butterfly in the family Lycaenidae. It is found in the Democratic Republic of the Congo (Kasai, Lomami, Lualaba and Shaba) and Zimbabwe.

Adults have been recorded on wing in December.

References

Butterflies described in 1892
Lepidochrysops
Butterflies of Africa